The Provisional government was the first government of the French Second Republic, formed on 24 February 1848 following the abolishment of the July Monarchy by the February Revolution. The provisional government was succeeded on 9 May 1848 by the Executive Commission.

Formation

The Provisional Government was formed after three days of street fighting in Paris that ended in the abdication of King Louis Philippe I at noon on February 24.
The leaders of the government were selected by acclamation in two different meetings later that day, one at the Chamber of Deputies and the other at the Hôtel de Ville.
The first set of seven names, chosen at the Chamber of Deputies, came from the list of deputies made by the moderate republican paper Le National.
The second set of names, chosen at the Hôtel de Ville, came from a list made by the more radical republican paper La Réforme. 
In addition to the first set of deputies it included three journalists and a representative of the workers.
Later that evening the combined list was acclaimed at the Hôtel de Ville.

The members of the new Provisional Government collectively acted as head of state. They included the former deputies Jacques-Charles Dupont de l'Eure, Alphonse de Lamartine, Adolphe Crémieux, François Arago, Alexandre Auguste Ledru-Rollin, Louis-Antoine Garnier-Pagès and Pierre Marie de Saint-Georges.
The three journalists were Armand Marrast, Louis Blanc (a socialist) and Ferdinand Flocon. The representative of the workers was Alexandre Martin, known as "Albert".

Ministers
Like its successor, the Executive Commission, the provisional government had a collective leadership, that exercised the power of head of state for all its duration.

The positions of power in the Provisional Government were mainly given to moderate republicans, although Étienne Arago was made Minister of Posts and Marc Caussidière became Prefect of Police. Alexandre Martin ("Albert"), Louis Blanc and Ferdinand Flocon did not get ministerial portfolios, and so had little power. The ministers were:

Changes
 On 5 March 1848, Louis-Antoine Garnier-Pagès succeeded Michel Goudchaux as Finance Minister.
 On 20 March 1848, General Eugène Cavaignac succeeded Jacques Gerbais de Subervie was War Minister.
 On 5 April 1848, François Arago succeeded General Cavaignac as War Minister.

Key events

References

Sources

French governments
1848 establishments in France
1848 disestablishments in France
Cabinets established in 1848
Cabinets disestablished in 1848
Provisional governments